Bolley L. "Bo" Johnson (born November 15, 1951) is an American politician from the state of Florida. A member of the Democratic Party, Johnson was a member of the Florida House of Representatives, and served as the Speaker of the Florida House of Representatives.

Early life
Johnson is from Milton, Florida. His father and grandfather served as county commissioners for Santa Rosa County, Florida. Johnson graduated from Milton High School, and became the first member of his family to attend college. He received his bachelor's degree from Florida State University.

Career

Johnson volunteered for Mallory Horne when Horne served as the president of the Florida Senate. At the age of 22, Johnson met Lawton Chiles, then a member of the United States Senate, who hired him as a legislative aide in 1973.

Johnson was elected to the Florida House of Representatives, representing the 4th district from November 7, 1978 to November 3, 1992. He also served the 1st district from November 3, 1992 to November 8, 1994. He became the Speaker of the Florida House of Representatives in 1992.

Arrest and conviction 
In 1999, Johnson and his wife were convicted of tax evasion, for failing to report income earned from consulting with Bally Entertainment. He was sentenced to two years in prison, while Judi was sentenced to 15 months. They began serving their sentences on August 30.

After
He decided not to run for re-election to the Florida House in 1994. He opted not to run for the United States House of Representatives. After leaving politics, Johnson moved to Pensacola, Florida, where he worked as a real estate broker.

Personal
In 1999 Bolley "Bo" Johnson was convicted of tax evasion along with his wife Judi. According to court documents they failed report $452,675 in consulting fee income. Both of them served 15 months in federal prison.

Johnson and his wife, Judi, have a daughter. A niece also lived with them as a child. Johnson is a Methodist.

References

External links

1951 births
Living people
Speakers of the Florida House of Representatives
Democratic Party members of the Florida House of Representatives
People from Milton, Florida
Florida State University alumni
Pensacola Junior College alumni
American United Methodists
Florida politicians convicted of crimes